José Nájera may refer to:

 José Nájera (wrestler) (1951-2017), Mexican wrestler better known as Fishman
 José Nájera (footballer) (born 1988), Colombian footballer